Vehicle Excise Duty (VED; also known as "vehicle tax", "car tax", and more controversially as "road tax", and formerly as a "tax disc") is an annual tax that is levied as an excise duty and which must be paid for most types of powered vehicles which are to be used (or parked) on public roads in the United Kingdom. Registered vehicles that are not being used or parked on public roads and which have been taxed since 31 January 1998, must be covered by a Statutory Off Road Notification (SORN) to avoid VED. In 2016, VED generated approximately £6 billion for the Exchequer.

A vehicle tax was first introduced in Britain in 1888. In 1920, an excise duty was introduced that was specifically applied to motor vehicles; initially it was hypothecated (ring-fenced or earmarked) for road construction and paid directly into a special Road Fund. After 1937, this reservation of vehicle revenue for roads was ended, and instead the revenue was paid into the Consolidated Fund – the general pot of money held by government. Since then, maintenance of the UK road network has been funded out of general taxation, of which VED is a part.

Current regulations

VED across the United Kingdom is collected and enforced by the Driver and Vehicle Licensing Agency (DVLA). Until 2014, VED in Northern Ireland was collected by the Driver and Vehicle Agency there; responsibility has since been transferred to the DVLA.

The licence is issued upon payment of the appropriate VED amount (which may be zero). Owners of registered vehicles which have been licensed since 31 January 1998 and who do not now wish to use or store a vehicle on the public highway are not required to pay VED, but are required to submit an annual Statutory Off-Road Notification (SORN). Failure to submit a SORN is punishable in the same manner as failure to pay duty when using the vehicle on public roads.

Until 1 October 2014 a vehicle licence (tax disc) had to be displayed on a vehicle (usually adhered inside the windscreen on the nearside, thus easily visible to officials patrolling roads on foot) as evidence of having paid the duty. Since that date, the circular paper discs have not been issued and there is no longer a requirement to display a disc as the records are now stored in a centralised database and accessible using the vehicle registration plate details.

Cars
There are three payment schedules in effect, depending on whether the car was first registered before or after 1 April 2017, or before 1 March 2001. Further changes will come into effect in April 2025, affecting new and existing electric vehicles.

Registered before 1 March 2001

For cars registered before 1 March 2001 the excise duty is based on engine size.

Registered before 1 April 2017

For vehicles registered between 1 March 2001 and 31 March 2017 charges are based on theoretical CO2 emission rates per kilometre. The price structure was revised from 1 April 2013 to introduce an alternative charge for the first year (the standard cost was not changed, and remained the same as for 2001 onwards). The "first year rate" only applies in the year the vehicle was first registered and is said by the government to be designed to send "a stronger signal to the buyer about the environmental implications of their car purchase".

Alternative fuel cars (TC59) all warrant a £10 discount from the below, except when zero-rated. Charges as applicable from 1 April 2022:

Registered after 1 April 2017
The biggest changes from April 2017 are that hybrid vehicles are no longer be rated at £0, and that cars with a retail price of £40,000 and over pay a supplement for years 2 to 6.

For cars with a "list price" over £40,000 an additional amount – the 'expensive car supplement' – is paid at the first five annual renewals, i.e. in years 2 to 6 of the vehicle's life. In  this supplement was increased to £355. At first the supplement applied to all types of car, but the 2020 Budget provided an exemption for zero-emission vehicles (both new and existing), effective from 1 April 2020.

Changes on 1 April 2025 
In November 2022, the UK government announced that reduced tax rates for zero-emission vehicles would cease on 1 April 2025, making rates the same as for those with internal combustion engines. The changes affect new and existing vehicles as follows:

 Zero-emission cars first registered on or after 1 April 2017 will pay the 1–50g/km rate in their first year of registration, and the standard annual rate in subsequent years.
 The £10 reduction for alternative fuel vehicles and hybrid vehicles will be removed, bringing them also onto the standard rate.
 The exemption from the expensive car supplement was already due to end in 2025.

Other vehicle tax rates

Light goods vehicles (TC39) 
Registered on or after 1 March 2001 and not over 3,500 kg revenue weight (also known as maximum or gross vehicle weight).

Euro 4 light goods vehicles (TC36) 
Registered between 1 March 2003 and 31 December 2006, Euro 4 compliant and not over 3,500 kg revenue weight.

Euro 5 light goods vehicles (TC36) 
Registered between 1 January 2009 and 31 December 2010, Euro 5 compliant and not over 3,500 kg revenue weight.

Motorcycle (with or without sidecar) (TC17)

Tricycles (not over 450kg unladen) (TC50)

Trade licences 
Trade licences are available for between 6 and 12 months, depending on the month in which the application is made.

Heavy goods vehicles 
Taxation for use of heavy goods vehicles on UK roads are based on the size, weight per axle.

The HGV levy is suspended from 1 August 2020 to 31 July 2023 to support the haulage sector and aid pandemic recovery efforts.

Previous rates were:

Exempt vehicles
Various classes and uses of vehicle are exempt, including vehicles older than 40 years (see below), trams, vehicles which cannot convey people, police vehicles, fire engines, ambulances and health service vehicles, mine rescue vehicles, lifeboat vehicles, certain road construction and maintenance vehicles, vehicles for disabled people, certain agricultural and land maintenance vehicles, road gritters and snow ploughs, vehicles undergoing statutory tests, vehicles imported by members of foreign armed forces, and crown vehicles. Electrically propelled vehicles were exempt until 1995 (at a time when the most common electric vehicles were milk floats); today, they are not exempt, but are generally zero rated.

Each year on 1 April, vehicles constructed more than forty years before the start of that year become eligible for a free vehicle licence under "historic vehicle" legislation. This is due to the age of the vehicle and a presumption of limited mileage. Initially this was a rolling exemption applied to any vehicles over 25 years old; however, in 1997 the cutoff date was frozen at 1 January 1973. The change to "pre-1973" was unpopular in the classic motoring community, and a number of classic car clubs campaigned for a change back to the previous system.  In 2006 there were 307,407 vehicles in this category.

As of 1 April 2014, vehicles manufactured before 1 January 1974 became exempt from the VED (Finance Act 2014, as set out in the 2013 Budget, 20 March 2013).

In the 2014 Budget, the government introduced a forty-year rolling exemption, with vehicles built before 1 January 1975 becoming exempt on 1 April 2015 and so on.

Enforcement

In 2008 it was reported that flaws in DVLA enforcement practices have meant that more than a million late-paying drivers per year have evaded detection, which lost £214 million in VED revenue during 2006. It was estimated that 6.7% of motorcycles were not taxed in 2007. Since then better systems reduced the loss to an estimated £33.9 million in 2009/2010.

Automatic number plate recognition (ANPR) systems are being used to identify untaxed, uninsured vehicles and stolen cars.

History

Following the 1888 budget, two new vehicle duties were introduced – the locomotive duty and the trade cart duty (a general wheel-tax also announced in the same budget was abandoned). The locomotive duty was levied at £5 (equivalent to £ as of ), for each locomotive used on the public roads and the trade cart duty was introduced for all trade vehicles (including those which were mechanically powered) not subject to the existing carriage duty, with the exception of those used in agriculture and those weighing less than 10 cwt-imperial, at the rate of 5s (£0.25) per wheel.

The Road Fund
In the budget of 1909, the then Chancellor of the Exchequer, David Lloyd George announced that the roads system would be self-financing, and so from 1910 the proceeds of road vehicle excise duties were dedicated to fund the building and maintenance of the road system. Even during this period the majority of the cost of road building and improvement came from general and local taxation owing to the tax being too low for the upkeep of the roads.

The Roads Act 1920 required councils to "register all new vehicles and to allocate a separate number to each vehicle" and "make provision for the collection and application of the excise duties on mechanically propelled vehicles and on carriages". The Finance Act 1920 introduced a "Duty on licences for mechanically propelled vehicles" which was to be hypothecated – that is, the revenue would be exclusively dedicated to a particular expenditure, namely the newly established Road Fund. Excise duties specifically for mechanically propelled vehicles were first imposed in 1921, along with the requirement to display a vehicle licence (tax disc) on the vehicle.

End of hypothecation
The accumulated Road Fund was never fully spent on roads (most of it was spent on resurfacing, not the building of new roads), and became notorious for being used for other government purposes, a practice introduced by Winston Churchill when he was Chancellor of the Exchequer.  In 1926, by which time the direct use of taxes collected from motorists to fund the road network was already opposed by many in government, the Chancellor, Winston Churchill is reported to have said in a memo: "Entertainments may be taxed; public houses may be taxed ... and the yield devoted to the general revenue.  But motorists are to be privileged for all time to have the tax on motors devoted to roads? This is an outrage upon ... common sense."  Hypothecation came to an end in 1937 under the 1936 Finance Act, and the proceeds of the vehicle road taxes were paid directly into the Exchequer.  The Road Fund itself, then funded by government grants, was not abolished until 1955.

1990s
Since 1998, keepers of registered vehicles which had been licensed since 1998, but which were not currently using the public roads, have been required to submit an annual Statutory Off-Road Notification (SORN). Failure to submit a SORN is punishable in the same manner as failure to pay duty when using the vehicle on public roads. It was announced in the 2013 Budget that SORN declarations would become perpetual, thus removing the need for annual renewal after the initial declaration has been made. In June 1999, a reduced VED band was introduced for cars with an engine capacity up to 1100cc. The cost of 12 months tax for cars up to 1100cc was £100, and for those above 1100cc was £155.

Emissions ratings tax
During the 1990s, political arguments were put forward for the abolition of VED. Among the proposals was a suggestion that VED could be replaced by increased fuel duty as an incentive for consumers to purchase vehicles with lower emission ratings. The proposal was politically unappealing, as it would increase costs for businesses and for people living in rural areas. Rather than abolish VED, the Labour government under Tony Blair introduced a new system for calculating of VED that was linked explicitly with a vehicle's carbon emissions ratings, as a means for vehicle emissions control. Since then, VED was levied in a system of tax bands based on CO2 ratings.

In the pre-budget report of 27 November 2001 the Government announced that VED for HGVs could be replaced, by a new tax based on distance travelled, the Lorry Road-User Charge (LRUC). At the same time, the rate of fuel duty would be cut for such vehicles. As at the start of 2007 this scheme is still at a proposal stage and no indicated start date has been given. The primary aim of the proposed change was that HGVs from the UK and the continent would pay exactly the same to use British roads (removing the ability of foreign vehicles to pay no UK tax). However, it was also expected that the tax would be used to influence routes taken (charging lower rates to use motorways), reduce congestion (by varying the charge with time of day), and encourage low emissions ratings vehicles.

In tax year 2002–2003, it is estimated that evasion of the tax equated to a loss to the Exchequer of £206 million. In an attempt to reduce this, from 2004 an automatic £80 penalty (halved if paid within 28 days) is issued by the DVLA computer for failure to pay the tax within one month of expiry. A maximum fine of £1,000 applies for failure to pay the tax, though in practice fines are normally much lower.

In June 2005 the government announced plans to adopt a road user charging scheme for all road vehicles, which would work by tracing the movement of vehicles using a telematics system. The idea raised objections on civil and human rights grounds that it would amount to mass surveillance. An online petition protesting this was started and reached over 1.8 million signatures by the closing date of 20 February 2007.

In April 2009 there was a reclassification to the CO2 rating based bandings with the highest set at £455 per year and the lowest at £0; the bandings have also been backdated to cover vehicles registered on or after 1 March 2001, meaning that vehicles with the highest emissions ratings registered after this date pay the most. Vehicles registered before 1 March 2001 will still continued to be charged according to engine size, above or below 1549cc.

In 2009 a consultation document from the Scottish Government raised the possibility of a VED on all road users including cyclists, but there was a strong consensus against this.

From 2010 a new first year rate is to be introduced – dubbed a showroom tax. This new tax was announced in the 2008 budget, and the level of tax payable will be based on the vehicle excise duty band, ranging from £0 for vehicles in the lower bands, up to £950 for vehicles in the highest band.

VED can be automatically be collected from a bank account by Direct Debit however this cannot be applied to vehicles with a £0 VED, for these a paper reminder is sent to the registered keeper who then has to renew at a post office or online. 34,000 drivers were fined in 2017/18 for not renewing.

See also
Car costs
London congestion charge
Motoring taxation in the United Kingdom
Road Fund
Vehicle registration plates of the United Kingdom
Velology – the study and collection of tax discs
Vignette (road tax)

References

External links
UK vehicle tax information on Directgov
Apply online
VED Calculator (for cars registered after April 2017)

Motoring taxation in the United Kingdom
Vehicle taxes
Transport policy in the United Kingdom
1888 introductions
Car costs